Blackberry Blossom is an album by American guitarist Norman Blake.

Blackberry Blossom may also refer to:

 "Blackberry Blossom" (tune), a traditional fiddle tune
 Flower of the blackberry